Mark Anthony Brown (born July 13, 1959) is a former professional baseball pitcher. He pitched parts of two seasons in Major League Baseball, 1984 for the Baltimore Orioles and 1985 for the Minnesota Twins. He played college baseball for the University of Massachusetts.

External links

Major League Baseball pitchers
Baltimore Orioles players
Minnesota Twins players
Bluefield Orioles players
Miami Orioles players
Hagerstown Suns players
Charlotte O's players
Rochester Red Wings players
Toledo Mud Hens players
Baseball players from Vermont
1959 births
Living people
People from Bellows Falls, Vermont
UMass Minutemen baseball players
Loomis Chaffee School alumni